Üçbulaq may refer to:
 Üçbulaq, Fizuli, Azerbaijan
 Üçbulaq, Goygol, Azerbaijan